Wherever She Goes is a 1951 Australian feature film that tells the early part of the life story of pianist Eileen Joyce. Directed by Michael Gordon, it stars Suzanne Parrett, Eileen Joyce, Nigel Lovell and Muriel Steinbeck.

Synopsis
Eileen Joyce is born on the Tasmanian coast and becomes fascinated with music after hearing a man named Daniel play a mouth organ. When her parents decide to move the family to the Kalgoorlie goldfields Eileen sees a piano and resolves to play it. Her father's mine fails and the family has to live in a tent.

Eileen is given an old piano as a Christmas gift and soon becomes a child prodigy. She enters a local music carnival and wins. The story ends when she leaves Kalgoorlie to go to Perth, then flashes forward to a grown up Eileen playing in a concert.

Cast
Suzanne Parrett as young Eileen Joyce
Muriel Steinbeck as Mrs Joyce
Nigel Lovell as Will Joyce
George Wallace as the stage manager
Eileen Joyce as herself (non-speaking role)
Tim Drysdale as John Joyce
Rex Dawe as Mr James
Syd Chambers
John Wiltshire as Daniel
  Harold Bourne as Bob

Production
The film was one of several planned by independent companies in association with Ealing Studios to use Pagewood Studios in between official Ealing productions.

The director was Michael Gordon (1909 – 2008), an English film editor, and it was the only full-length feature film he directed. He had given a copy of the book on which the film was based to his children, and his wife suggested that it would make a good film. Both the book and the film were highly fictionalised accounts of Joyce's life. The opening credits of the film state that only the two children were real people and everyone else was fictionalised.

Gordon arrived in Australia in August 1949 to start work on the film. Eileen Joyce herself is shown at the start and end of the film, performing the Grieg Piano Concerto in A minor, but she was primarily played by Suzanne Parrett, who never made another film. Parrett's hand double was Pamela Page.

The bulk of the movie was shot at Pagewood Studios in Sydney, with some location filming in Kalgoorlie and the Huon Valley. It features the last screen performance of comedian George Wallace, who plays a stage manager. The cast also includes Tim Drysdale, son of Australian artist Russell Drysdale.

Reception
The film had its Australian premiere at The Strand Theatre in Hobart, and was introduced by Tasmanian Premier Robert Cosgrove. It was one of the few Australian films of the time to receive a cinema release in the United States as well as the UK, but box office receipts were poor and critical reception mixed although Suzanne Parrett's performance was praised.

Filmink later argued "Steinbeck should have played the title role but is wasted in the part of her mother."

References

External links
Wherever She Goes in the Internet Movie Database
[http://colsearch.nfsa.gov.au/nfsa/search/display/display.w3p;adv=;group=;groupequals=;holdingType=;page=0;parentid=;query=wherever%20she%20goes;querytype=;rec=4;resCount=10 Wherever She Goes'''] at National Film and Sound Archive
Wherever She Goes at Oz Movies
Review at Variety''

1951 films
Australian drama films
Films about classical music and musicians
Musical films based on actual events
1951 drama films
Australian black-and-white films
Biographical films about musicians
1950s English-language films